"Feel It Again" is a song by Canadian hard rock band Honeymoon Suite.  Written by the band's keyboardist, Ray Coburn and released in 1986 as a single from Honeymoon Suite's second album, The Big Prize, the song was the band's first top 20 hit in Canada and was also the band's biggest stateside hit, reaching #34 on the Billboard Hot 100 on the week ending May 10, 1986.  It remains Honeymoon Suite's only top 40 hit in the U.S. to date.

In 2015, Coburn was presented with a SOCAN Classic Award based on the song having been played more than 100,000 times on Canadian radio.

References

1985 songs
1986 singles
Honeymoon Suite songs
Warner Music Group singles